The Distorted Music Festival was an Australian electronic music festival held at Melbourne's Brown Alley on 10 December 2005.

It showcased electronic artists who are not generally considered to be mainstream. It covered the musical genres of industrial, noise, power noise, breakcore, IDM and glitch.

The philosophy of the festival is to bring to Australia international acts who would otherwise never play in the country. The festival also showcases local Australian artists, giving them the chance to play alongside the big names in the scene.

Band lineup 

2005: Architect, Black Lung, Cambion, Converter, the Crystalline Effect, Defused Fusion, Delta of Venus, Enduser, EPA, Jetlag, Killjoy,  Maladroit, Mechanised Convulsions, Mono No Aware, the Mutagen Server, Noistruct, n0nplus, Null Hypothesis, Scorn, Vespine, Xian.
(The USA band C/A/T was invited, but unable to attend.)

See also 

List of industrial music festivals
List of electronic music festivals

References

External links 

  archived from the original on 20 August 2006. Retrieved 23 September 2017.

Music festivals in Melbourne
Electronic music festivals in Australia
Music festivals established in 2005
Industrial music festivals